Mar de Fondo Fútbol Club is a football club from Montevideo, Uruguay. They currently play in the Second Amateur Division, the third and last tier of the Uruguayan championship.

Titles
 Divisional Intermedia (4): 1952, 1958, 1961, 1969
Divisional Extra (1): 1951

External links

Mar de Fondo
Mar de Fondo
Mar de Fondo
1934 establishments in Uruguay